Metro Pulse (Japanese: メトロパルス Metoro Parusu; romanized as METRO PULSE) is the sixteenth studio album of Japanese duo Capsule, released on December 14, 2022 by Warner Music Japan. This is the duo's first album release in nearly eight years since their 2015 album Wave Runner.

Commercial performance 
Metro Pulse debuted at number 23 of the Oricon Weekly Albums chart with 3,317 copies sold on its first week of release. It also debuted at number 16 of the Oricon Digital Albums chart with 462 downloads.

Track listing

Charts

Release history

References

2022 albums
Albums produced by Yasutaka Nakata
Capsule (band) albums
Electronic albums by Japanese artists
Japanese-language albums
Synthwave albums
Warner Music Japan albums